Statistics of Division 2 for the 1967–68 season.

Overview
It was contested by 19 teams, and Bastia won the championship.

League standings

References
France - List of final tables (RSSSF)

Ligue 2 seasons
French
2